Jirgalang or Jirhalang (Manchu: 19 November 1599 – June 11, 1655) was a Manchu noble, regent, and political and military leader of the early Qing dynasty. Born in the Aisin Gioro clan, he was the sixth son of Šurhaci, a younger brother of Nurhaci, the founder of the Qing dynasty. From 1638 to 1643, he took part in many military campaigns that helped destroy the Ming dynasty. After the death of Huangtaiji (Nurhaci's successor) in September 1643, Jirgalang became one of the young Shunzhi Emperor's two co-regents, but he soon yielded most political power to co-regent Dorgon in October 1644. Dorgon eventually purged him of his regent title in 1647. After Dorgon died in 1650, Jirgalang led an effort to clean the government of Dorgon's supporters. Jirgalang was one of ten "princes of the first rank" (和碩親王) whose descendants were made "iron-cap" princes (鐵帽子王), who had the right to transmit their princely titles to their direct male descendants perpetually.

Career before 1643
In 1627, Jirgalang took part in the first Manchu campaign against Korea under the command of his older brother Amin. In 1630, when Amin was stripped of his titles for having failed to fight an army of the Ming dynasty, Huangtaiji gave Jirgalang control of the Bordered Blue Banner, which had been under Amin's command. As one of "four senior beile" (the other three were Daišan, Manggūltai, and Huangtaiji himself), Jirgalang participated in many military campaigns against the Ming and the Chahar Mongols. In 1636 he was granted the title "Prince Zheng of the First Rank", with rights of perpetual inheritance. In 1642, Jirgalang led the siege of Jinzhou, an important Ming city in Liaodong that surrendered to Qing forces in April of that year after more than one year of resistance.

Co-regency (1643-1647) and disgrace (1647-1650)

While Dorgon was staying in Mukden, in November or December 1643 Jirgalang was sent to attack Shanhai Pass, a fortified Ming position that guarded access to the plain around Beijing. In January or February 1644, Jirgalang requested that his name be placed after Dorgon's in all official communications. On February 17, 1644, Jirgalang, who was a capable military leader but looked uninterested in managing state affairs, willingly yielded control of all official matters to Dorgon. He was not present when Qing forces entered Beijing in early June 1644. In 1647 he was removed from his post of regent and replaced by Dorgon's brother Dodo. Despite his removal, Jirgalang continued to serve as a military leader. In March 1648, Dorgon ordered the arrest of Jirgalang on various charges and had Jirgalang degraded from a qinwang (first-rank prince) to a junwang (second-rank prince). Later in the same year, however, Jirgalang was sent to southern China to fight troops loyal to the Southern Ming. In early 1649, Jirgalang, accompanied by Han Chinese soldiers under Han Chinese banner general Prince Kong Youde loyal to the Qing, ordered a six-day massacre of the inhabitants of the city of Xiangtan in present-day Hunan due to fierce resistance by Li Chixin's army who were former Chuang (Li Zicheng's) partisans. Southern Ming loyalist He Tengjiao was also killed at Xiangtan by Kong Youde. He returned to Beijing in 1650 after having the capture of He Tengjiao against the forces of the Yongli Emperor, the last ruler of the Southern Ming regime.

The "Jirgalang faction" (1651-1655)
The group led by Jirgalang that historian Robert Oxnam has called the "Jirgalang faction" was composed of Manchu princes and nobles who had opposed Dorgon and who returned to power after the latter died on December 31, 1650. Concerned that Dorgon's brother Ajige may try to succeed Dorgon, Jirgalang and his group arrested Ajige in early 1651. Jirgalang remained a powerful figure at the Qing imperial court until his death in 1655. The four future regents of the Kangxi Emperor, Oboi, Ebilun, Sonin, and Suksaha, were among his supporters.

Death and posterity
Soon after Jirgalang died of illness on June 11, 1655, his second son Jidu (1633–1660) inherited his princely title, but the name of the princehood was changed from "Zheng" (鄭) to "Jian" (簡). The title "Prince Zheng" was re-established in 1778 when the Qianlong Emperor praised Jirgalang for his role in the Qing defeat of Ming and granted Jirgalang a place in the Imperial Ancestral Temple.

Jirgalang's second son Jidu and Jidu's second son Labu (d. 1681) participated in military campaigns in the second half of the Shunzhi Emperor's reign and the early reign of the Kangxi Emperor, notably against Koxinga and Wu Sangui.

Jirgalang's 13th generation descendants Duanhua (Prince Zheng) and Sushun (Duanhua's younger brother) were politically active during the reign of the Xianfeng Emperor (r. 1851-1861). They were appointed as two of eight regents for the infant Tongzhi Emperor (r. 1862-1874), but were quickly overthrown in 1861 in the Xinyou Coup that brought Empress Dowager Cixi and the young emperor's uncle Prince Gong to power.

Family 
Father: Šurhaci

 Paternal Grandfather: Taksi, Emperor Xuan 
 Paternal grandmother: Hitara Emeci, Empress Xuan (喜塔拉。额穆齐, 宣皇后)

Mother: Ula Nara Hunai, secondary consort ( 侧福晋 乌拉那拉·虎奈)

 Maternal grandfather: 

Consorts and issue:

 Primary consort, of the Niohuru clan (嫡福晋 钮祜禄氏), daughter of Eidu
 Primary consort, of the Yehe-Nara clan (继福晋 叶赫那拉氏), daughter of prince De'erheli (德尔赫礼台吉), granddaughter of Yehe beile Gintaisi (金台石, pinyin:jintaishi), elder sister of Sutai.
 Secondary consort, of the Gu'erhasu clan (侧福晋 钴尔哈苏氏)，daughter of tabunang Zhuoliketu (卓礼克图塔布囊)
 Jidu (济度;1633-1660), second son, Prince Jianchun of the First Rank (简纯亲王)
 Secondary consort, of the Jarud Borjigin clan (扎鲁特博尔济吉特氏), daughter of beile Bage (巴格贝勒)
 Fu'erdun (富尔敦;1633-1651), first son, heir apparent Quehou (悫厚世子)
 Ledu (勒度;1636-1655), third son, 
 Secondary consort, Yehenara Sutai (叶赫那拉·苏泰), daughter of De'erheli (德尔赫礼台吉)
 Mistress , of the Gūwalgiya clan (庶福晋 瓜尔佳氏), daughter of Chalalai (察喇赖)
 Xitujun (锡图军; 1642-1651), sixth son
 Mistress, of the Sardu clan (庶福晋 萨尔都氏), daughter of Master Commander of Cavalry Dahu (云骑尉达祜)
 Gumei (固美), Bulwark General (辅国将军), seventh son
 Mistress, of the Gūwalgiya clan(庶福晋 瓜尔佳氏), daughter of Zhata (扎塔)
 Ba'erkan (巴尔堪), Prince Jianwu of the First Rank (简武亲王), fourth son
 Mistress, of the An clan (庶福晋 安氏), daughter of Tielani (贴喇尼)
 Kunlan (裈兰), fifth son, served as first rank military official (都统)
 Mistress, of the Yun clan (庶福晋 云氏), daughter of Dekesuoni (德克素尼)
 Wuxi (武锡;1653-1707), Bulwark General (辅国将军)
 Mistress, of the Daigiya clan (庶福晋 戴佳氏), daughter of Master Commander of Cavalry Nandahai (云骑尉品级南达海)
 Mistress, of the Niohuru clan (庶福晋 钮祜禄氏), daughter of Bai'erge (伯尔格)
 Liuxi (留锡;1648-1703), eighth son
 Wife, of the Hešeri clan(妾 赫舍里氏), daughter of Daidali (戴达礼)
 Hailun (海伦, 1655-1683), tenth son
 Wife, of the Ma clan (妾 马氏), daughter of Wulai (武赖)
 Wife, of Dai clan (妾戴氏), daughter of Xiaoqijiao songkun (骁骑校松坤) 
 Wife, of the Jin clan (妾晋氏), daughter of Shanlong (山隆)
 Wife, of the Mengguosu clan (妾蒙郭苏氏), daughter of Maimishan (迈密山)
 First daughter
 married E'erkedaiqing (额尔克戴青) of the Borjigin clan

In popular culture
Portrayed by Im Byung-ki in the 1981 KBS1 TV Series Daemyeong.
Portrayed by Liu Haikuan in the 2017 TV Series Rule the World.

See also
 Prince Zheng
 Royal and noble ranks of the Qing dynasty
 Ranks of imperial consorts in China#Qing

Notes

References

Li Zhiting 李治亭 (editor in chief). (2003). Qingchao tongshi: Shunzhi juan 清朝通史: 順治卷 ["General History of the Qing dynasty: Shunzhi volume"]. Beijing: Zijincheng chubanshe.
Oxnam, Robert B. (1975). Ruling from Horseback: Manchu Politics in the Oboi Regency, 1661-1669. Chicago and London: University of Chicago Press.
Wakeman, Frederic (1985). The Great Enterprise: The Manchu Reconstruction of Imperial Order in Seventeenth-Century China. Berkeley and Los Angeles: University of California Press.

1599 births
1655 deaths
Deliberative Princes and Ministers
Qing dynasty imperial princes
Qing dynasty regents
Manchu Bordered Blue Bannermen
Prince Zheng
Imperial Clan of Qing dynasty